HMCS Agassiz was a  of the Royal Canadian Navy. Named after the community of Agassiz, British Columbia, the ship was constructed by Burrard Dry Dock Co. Ltd. in North Vancouver, British Columbia and was launched on 15 August 1940. The corvette was commissioned on 23 January 1941 in Vancouver, British Columbia. The Flower class were initially designed for coastal service during the Second World War, but due to the demands of the Battle of the Atlantic, Agassiz was used primarily as an ocean escort for convoys crossing the Atlantic Ocean in engagements with German submarines. Following the war, the corvette was sold for scrap.

Design and description

Flower-class corvettes like Agassiz serving with the Royal Canadian Navy during the Second World War were different from earlier and more traditional sail-driven corvettes. The Flower-class corvettes originated from a need that arose in 1938 to expand the Royal Navy following the Munich Crisis. A design request went out for a small escort for coastal convoys. The Scotch boilers were replaced with water-tube boilers in later 1939–1940 and 1940–1941 Programme ships. The vessels were extremely wet.

The Canadian Flower-class vessels were initially armed with a Mk IX BL  gun forward on a CP 1 mounting and carried 100 rounds per gun. The corvettes were also armed with a QF Vickers 2-pounder gun on a bandstand aft, two single-mounted .303 Vickers machine guns or Browning 0.5-calibre machine guns for anti-aircraft defence and two twin-mounted .303 Lewis machine guns, usually sited on bridge wings. For anti-submarine warfare, they mounted two depth charge throwers and initially carried 25 depth charges. The corvettes were designed with a Type 123 ASDIC sonar set installed. The Flower-class ships had a complement of 47 officers and ratings. The Royal Canadian Navy initially ordered 54 corvettes in 1940 and these were fitted with Mark II Oropesa minesweeping gear used for destroying contact mines. Part of the depth charge rails were made portable so the minesweeping gear could be utilised.

Modifications
In Canadian service the vessels were altered due to experience with the design's deficiencies. The galley was moved further back in the ship and the mess and sleeping quarters combined. A direction-finding set was installed and enlarged bilge keels were installed to reduce rolling. After the first 35–40 corvettes had been constructed, the foremast was shifted aft of the bridge and the mainmast was eliminated. Corvettes were first fitted with basic SW-1 and SW-2 CQ surface warning radar, notable for their fishbone-like antenna and reputation for failure in poor weather or in the dark. The compass house was moved further aft and the open-type bridge was situated in front of it. The ASDIC hut was moved in front and to a lower position on the bridge. The improved Type 271 radar was placed aft, with some units receiving Type 291 radar for air search. The minesweeping gear, a feature of the first 54 corvettes, was removed. Most Canadian Flower-class corvettes had their forecastles extended which improved crew accommodation and seakeeping. Furthermore, the sheer and flare of the bow was increased, which led to an enlarged bridge. This allowed for the installation of Oerlikon  cannon, replacing the Browning and Vickers machine guns. Some of the corvettes were rearmed with Hedgehog anti-submarine mortars. The complements of the ships grew throughout the war rising from the initial 47 to as many as 104.

Construction and career
The vessel was ordered as part of the 1939–1940 Progamme in January 1940, and laid down on 29 April 1940 by Burrard Dry Dock Co. Ltd. in North Vancouver, British Columbia. Corvettes commissioned by the Royal Canadian Navy during the Second World War were not named after flowers, as the class name might suggest, but after communities for the most part, to better represent the people who took part in building them. This idea was put forth by Admiral Percy W. Nelles. Sponsors were commonly associated with the community for which the ship was named. Agassiz, named for the town in British Columbia, was launched on 15 August 1940 and commissioned on 23 January 1941 in Vancouver, British Columbia with the pennant number K129.

After completion Agassiz was sent to Halifax, Nova Scotia, with sister ships  and  via the Panama Canal arriving on 13 April 1941. In May 1941 she was assigned to the Newfoundland Escort Force. She served continuously as an ocean escort until the end of 1943. In August 1941, Agassiz was part of the escort 57-ship HX 143 convoy, which was guided around a German U-boat concentration in the North Atlantic. On 1 September 1941, the escort groups were reformed and Agassiz joined Escort Group 19.

On 18 September 1941, the German submarine  sighted the convoy SC 44 in the North Atlantic. Only four U-boats moved to engage and during the first night of battle, Lévis was sunk. Agassiz recovered her survivors. Four merchant vessels were sunk as well on 18/19 September. In response to the sinkings, the convoy protection was enhanced with the arrival of three more corvettes.

Agassiz participated in the battle for convoy ON 102 with Mid-Ocean Escort Force (MOEF) group A3 in July 1942. She also fought the battles for convoy SC 97 with MOEF group C2 and the battles for convoy ON 115 and convoy SC 109 with MOEF group C3. During the battle for ON 115, Agassiz opened fire on a surfaced U-boat, then aided in the recovery of the crew of the sunken . The corvette then took the tanker G. S. Waldron under tow after the ship had been torpedoed and crippled and brought it to safety. The crew received salvage money for the effort. In August 1942, Agassiz was re-assigned to the Caribbean Sea, escorting convoys of oil tankers between Caribbean ports. The corvette was part of the escort of the convoy TAW 12, travelling between Trinidad, Aruba and Key West that lost several ships.

The ship's first major refit took place at Liverpool, Nova Scotia from early January 1943 until mid-March. Following her workups after her first major refit in early 1943, Agassiz was assigned to MOEF group C1 and escorted 12 trans-Atlantic convoys without loss before another major yard overhaul. The second took place at New York, beginning in December 1943 and taking until March 1944 to complete. During her second refit, her forecastle was extended. After that overhaul, Agassiz escorted North American coastal convoys with the Western Local Escort Force from March 1944 until February 1945. In April 1944, she was assigned to escort group W-2 and in August of that year to W-7. She remained with that group until the end of the war.

Following the end of hostilities Agassiz was paid off 14 June 1945 at Sydney, Nova Scotia. For service in during the Second World War, Agassiz was awarded the battle honours "Atlantic 1941–45" and "Gulf of St. Lawrence 1944." She was sold for scrap November 1945 and broken up at Moncton, New Brunswick in 1946.

Trans-Atlantic convoys escorted

References

Sources
 
 
 
 
 
 
 
 
 

Flower-class corvettes of the Royal Canadian Navy
1940 ships
Ships built in British Columbia